Alf Binder was an Australian rugby league footballer who played in the 1920s and 1930s. He played for South Sydney in the NSWRL competition during the club's first golden era.

Playing career
Binder made his first grade debut for South Sydney against North Sydney at North Sydney Oval in Round 9 1928.  Binder played in Souths 1928 grand final victory over arch rivals Eastern Suburbs which was played at the Royal Agricultural Society Grounds.  The victory was Souths 4th premiership in a row.

In 1929, Binder played 17 games for Souths including the 1929 grand final victory over Newtown which Souths comprehensively won 30-10 at the Sydney Sports Ground.

Binder played one final season with Souths in 1930 before retiring at the end of the season. He later played for Goulburn.

References

South Sydney Rabbitohs players
Year of birth missing
Year of death missing
Place of birth missing
Place of death missing
Rugby league second-rows
Rugby league props
Rugby league hookers